Cesar van Loo (1743 – 1821), was a French painter.

Biography
He was born in Paris as Jules César Denis van Loo, but signed his paintings "Cesar van Loo".
He is known for winter landscapes.
He died in Paris.

References

César van Loo on Artnet

1743 births
1821 deaths
French painters
Artists from Paris